Ahlamerestaq may refer to:
 Ahlamerestaq-e Jonubi Rural District
 Ahlamerestaq-e Shomali Rural District